Omoglymmius ineditus is a species of beetle in the subfamily Rhysodidae. It was described by Dajoz in 1975.

References

ineditus
Beetles described in 1975